Jeremy Larsen (born May 18, 1984) is an American mixed martial artist, who formerly competed in the Featherweight division of the Ultimate Fighting Championship.

Mixed martial arts career

Early career
Larsen started his professional career in 2006. He fought mainly for Arizona-based promotion Rage in the Cage.

In February 2012, Larsen was announced as a cast member of The Ultimate Fighter: Live.

The Ultimate Fighter
Larsen defeated Jeff Smith during the entry round via unanimous decision. Following his win in the elimination round, Larsen was medically suspended by the Nevada State Athletic Commission (NSAC) due to a cut on his head. Despite the suspension, Larsen was able to enter the house, being the last pick of Team Cruz.

In episode 5, Larsen faced Michael Chiesa and lost via unanimous decision after two rounds.

Ultimate Fighting Championship
Larsen made his promotional debut against fellow TUF 15 competitor Joe Proctor on June 1, 2012 at The Ultimate Fighter 15 Finale. He lost via TKO early in the first round.

Larsen next faced Lucas Martins on May 18, 2013 at UFC on FX: Belfort vs. Rockhold. Despite being able to damage Martins significantly in the first two rounds, Martins knocked Larsen early in the third round. The performance earned both participants Fight of the Night honors.

Larsen was expected to face Matt Grice on October 19, 2013 at UFC 166. However, Grice was forced out of the bout after sustaining serious injuries in a car accident in his home state of Oklahoma. He was rescheduled to face Charles Oliveira at the same event, but Oliveira was also removed from the card due to injury. Larsen then faced short-notice replacement and promotional newcomer Andre Fili. He was defeated via TKO in the second round, and was subsequently released from the promotion shortly after.

Championships and accomplishments

Mixed martial arts
Ultimate Fighting Championship
Fight of the Night (one time)

Mixed martial arts record

|-
|Loss
|align=center|8–5 (1)
|Andre Fili
|TKO (punches)
|UFC 166
|
|align=center|2
|align=center|0:53
|Houston, Texas, United States
|
|-
|Loss
|align=center|8–4 (1)
|Lucas Martins
|KO (punch)
|UFC on FX: Belfort vs. Rockhold
|
|align=center|3
|align=center|0:13
|Jaraguá do Sul, Santa Catarina, Brazil
|
|-
|Loss
|align=center|8–3 (1)
|Joe Proctor
|TKO (knee and punches)
|The Ultimate Fighter 15 Finale
|
|align=center|1
|align=center|1:59
|Las Vegas, Nevada, United States
|
|-
|Win
|align=center|8–2 (1)
|Jeff Fletcher
|Decision (unanimous)
|TCF: Rumble at the Ranch 2
|
|align=center|3
|align=center|5:00
|Phoenix, Arizona, United States
|
|-
|Win
|align=center|7–2 (1)
|Sammy Ciurdar
|Decision (unanimous)
|TCF: Dawn of Champions
|
|align=center|3
|align=center|5:00
|Phoenix, Arizona, United States
|
|-
|Loss
|align=center|6–2 (1)
|Efrain Escudero
|Submission (armbar)
|Rage in the Cage 148
|
|align=center|3
|align=center|3:21
|Chandler, Arizona, United States
|
|-
|Win
|align=center|6–1 (1)
|Victor Meza
|Decision (unanimous)
|Rage in the Cage 142
|
|align=center|3
|align=center|3:00
|Chandler, Arizona, United States
|
|-
|Win
|align=center|5–1 (1)
|Tim Holden
|TKO (punches)
|Rage in the Cage 139
|
|align=center|1
|align=center|0:55
|Tucson, Arizona, United States
|
|-
|NC
|align=center|4–1 (1)
|Gabriel Casillas
|No contest
|Rage in the Cage 134
|
|align=center|2
|align=center|3:00
|Tucson, Arizona, United States
|
|-
|Win
|align=center|4–1
|Jeff Horlacher
|TKO (punches)
|AG: Extreme Beat Down
|
|align=center|1
|align=center|4:44
|Phoenix, Arizona, United States
|
|-
|Loss
|align=center|3–1
|Edgar García
|Decision (unanimous)
|Cage Supremacy 3
|
|align=center|3
|align=center|5:00
|Tucson, Arizona, United States
|
|-
|Win
|align=center|3–0
|Omur Cor
|Submission (rear-naked choke)
|Cage Supremacy 2
|
|align=center|1
|align=center|2:26
|Tucson, Arizona, United States
|
|-
|Win
|align=center|2–0
|Eric Schneider
|Submission (guillotine choke)
|Rage in the Cage 96
|
|align=center|3
|align=center|0:23
|Tucson, Arizona, United States
|
|-
|Win
|align=center|1–0
|Chance Butts
|Submission (guillotine choke)
|Rage in the Cage 88: Veteran's Day Rumble
|
|align=center|2
|align=center|1:00
|Tucson, Arizona, United States
|

References

External links
 
 

1984 births
Living people
Sportspeople from Tucson, Arizona
American male mixed martial artists
Mixed martial artists from Arizona
Featherweight mixed martial artists
Ultimate Fighting Championship male fighters